Jorge Alberto Francisco Valdano Castellanos (born 4 October 1955) is an Argentine former football player, coach, and the former general manager of Real Madrid. He is currently working as a commentator for beIN Sports. Nicknamed "The Philosopher of Football", he played as a forward.

With the Argentina national team, Valdano took part at the 1975 Copa América as well as the 1982 and 1986 FIFA World Cups, the latter of which Argentina won. He had a major influence in the 1986  win, scoring four goals in the tournament, including Argentina's second goal against West Germany in the final. In total, he earned 23 caps for his nation between 1975 and 1990, scoring seven goals.

Although he initially played for Newell's Old Boys, Alavés and Real Zaragoza, his most successful period at club level was at Real Madrid, where he won La Liga twice, the Copa de la Liga and two UEFA Cups. As a manager, he coached Spanish sides Tenerife, Real Madrid and Valencia. Considered a benchmark for the way he addressed various football clubs, Valdano participated in 2013 at the World Leadership Forum and in the World Business Forum in Mexico City, where he associated the world of sports and business behind it, where he listed the 11 powers of leadership, based on his last book.

Playing career

Club
Valdano started playing when he was 16 years old for Rosario's club Newell's Old Boys, where he also started playing professionally, as well as with the Argentina national football team, in 1972.

In 1975, he was transferred to Alavés of the Spanish Segunda División, where he played until 1979. In that year, he moved to Real Zaragoza of the Primera División, and then to Real Madrid in 1984, playing with the Quinta del Buitre. He helped them win the UEFA Cup in 1985 and 1986, scoring once in the 1985 final and twice in the 1986 final.

Stricken by hepatitis, he decided to retire in 1988 and became a sports commentator.

International

Valdano played 23 times for the Argentina national team between 1975 and 1990, scoring seven goals, four of them in the 1986 FIFA World Cup, including one against West Germany in the final, which Argentina went on to win. Other than the 1986 triumph, he also took part in the 1975 Copa América and the 1982 World Cup, but missed most of the latter tournament after being injured in Argentina's second game, against Hungary.

Managerial career
Valdano began his management career as the Real Madrid youth team coach. In April 1992, just before the end of the 1991–92 season, he became head coach of Tenerife, replacing fellow Argentinian Jorge Solari. He helped Tenerife avoid relegation at the end of 1991–92, and then the following season helped them qualify for the UEFA Cup. He also twice led Tenerife to final day victories that denied his former club Real Madrid winning the La Liga title (Barcelona winning it instead on both occasions). He then returned to Real Madrid in 1994, now as a coach, and led them to the 1994–95 Liga title.

He finally coached Valencia in 1996–97 before becoming Real Madrid's sporting director until his resignation in June 2005. In June 2009, he again returned to Real Madrid as director general and presidential aide. He was sacked from the position on 25 May 2011, however, after his relationship with the coaching staff, particularly head coach José Mourinho, had deteriorated.

Personal life
Valdano wrote the book Sueños de fútbol ("Dreams of football") and edited the book Cuentos de fútbol ("Football short stories") by diverse authors.

Real Madrid's former captain Raúl named his first-born son in honour of Valdano.

Career statistics

Club

International

Honours

Player
Newell's Old Boys
Argentine Primera División: 1974

Real Madrid
La Liga: 1985–86, 1986–87
Copa de la Liga: 1985
UEFA Cup: 1984–85, 1985–86

Argentina
FIFA World Cup: 1986

Individual
Awards
La Liga Foreign Player of the Year: 1985–86

Manager
Real Madrid
La Liga: 1994–95

Quotes
 Football is beginning to be a lie well documented by the media.
 [Diego] Maradona has no peers on the pitch, but he has turned his Life into a show, and is now living a personal ordeal that should not be imitated.
 The coach proposes and the player disposes, but the limits that the tactics impose on us are every day obfuscating more the expression of new talents. A pity.
 Every team that is good to the ball, is also good to the whole public.
 The bacillus of efficiency has also attacked football, and some dare to ask what's the point in playing well. I feel tempted to tell about the time they dared to ask Borges what is poetry for, to which he answered: "What is a sunrise for? What are caresses for? What is the smell of coffee for?" Each question sounded like a sentence: they are for pleasure, for emotion, for living.
 Football is made up of subjective feeling, of suggestion - and, in that, Anfield is unbeatable. Put a stick with shit hanging from it in the middle of this passionate, crazy stadium and there are people who will tell you it's a work of art. It's not: it's shit hanging from a stick [...] if football is going the way Chelsea and Liverpool are taking it, we had better be ready to wave goodbye to any expression of the cleverness and talent we have enjoyed for a century.
 Football is an excuse to make us happy.
When the new Santiago Bernabéu is finished, Anfield is what will look like a training ground.

References

Further reading

External links

 
 
 Q & A with Valdano at BBC Sport

1955 births
Living people
People from Belgrano Department, Santa Fe
Argentine football managers
Argentine expatriate football managers
Argentine footballers
Argentine people of Spanish descent
Newell's Old Boys footballers
La Liga managers
Real Madrid CF managers
Valencia CF managers
CD Tenerife managers
La Liga players
Real Zaragoza players
Real Madrid CF players
Deportivo Alavés players
FIFA World Cup-winning players
1982 FIFA World Cup players
1986 FIFA World Cup players
1975 Copa América players
Argentina international footballers
Argentine expatriate footballers
Argentine Primera División players
Expatriate football managers in Spain
Argentine expatriate sportspeople in Spain
Association football forwards
UEFA Cup winning players
Sportspeople from Santa Fe Province